Euline Brock Downtown Denton Transit Center (formerly Downtown Denton Transit Center) is a multimodal transit center that provides DCTA bus and A-train commuter rail connections in Denton, Texas. It is east of the Denton County Courthouse-on-the-Square and is the northern terminus of the A-train. In 2013, the station was renamed to honor Euline Brock, former mayor of Denton from 2000 to 2006.

The Euline Brock Downtown Denton Transit Center station is one of two stations within Denton, along with Medpark Station; the other three are in Lewisville.

References

External links
My A-train, DCTA

A-train (Denton County Transportation Authority) stations
Bus stations in Texas
Railway stations in Denton County, Texas
Railway stations in the United States opened in 2011
Buildings and structures in Denton, Texas